The 1987–88 Cypriot Fourth Division was the 3rd season of the Cypriot fourth-level football league. The championship was split into three geographical groups, representing the Districts of Cyprus. The winners were:
 Nicosia-Keryneia Group: Iraklis Gerolakkou
 Larnaca-Famagusta Group: APEAN Ayia Napa
 Limassol-Paphos Group: ATE PEK Parekklisias

The three winners gave playoff matches and the two first were promoted to the 1988–89 Cypriot Third Division. Seven teams were relegated to regional leagues.

See also
 Cypriot Fourth Division
 1987–88 Cypriot First Division
 1987–88 Cypriot Cup

Cypriot Fourth Division seasons
Cyprus
1987–88 in Cypriot football